Bogatell is a Barcelona Metro station located in the Bogatell neighbourhood in the district of Sant Martí, Barcelona. The station is served by L4 (yellow line).

It's located under Carrer de Pujade between Carrer de Zamora and Carrer de Pamplona. It can be accessed from both Carrer de Pujades and Carrer de Pere IV. There's a Bicing station nearby.

Services

See also
22@

External links

Trenscat.com

Railway stations in Spain opened in 1977
El Poblenou
Transport in Sant Martí (district)
Barcelona Metro line 4 stations